Disney's Children's Favorite Songs, Volume 2 is a record containing 25 classic children's songs. The songs are performed by Larry Groce and The Disneyland Children's Sing-Along Chorus (Choral Director: Betty Joyce). The record was produced in 1979 by Jymn Magon, and engineered by George Charouhas for Walt Disney Records. It was released by Disneyland Records in 1979 and by Walt Disney Records in 2006. Distribution by Buena Vista Pictures Distribution, Inc.

Track listing
All songs are public domain unless otherwise noted.

"The Farmer in the Dell"
"Yankee Doodle"
"On Top of Old Smokey"
Sailing Medley: "Blow the Man Down"/"My Bonnie Lies over the Ocean"/"Sailing, Sailing"/"Drunken Sailor"
"Camptown Races" (Stephen Foster)
"Old Blue"
"Here We Go Loopty-Loo"
"The Sidewalks of New York"
"Shortnin' Bread"
John Jacob Jingleheimer Schmidt
"Thumbelina (from the Disneyland/Golden Book Read-Along Thumbelina)" (Larry Groce)
"The Bear Went Over the Mountain"
"Red River Valley"
"Skip to My Lou" 
"Swanee River" (Stephen Foster)
Western Medley: "The Yellow Rose of Texas"/"Buffalo Gals"
"London Bridge"
"Here We Go Round the Mulberry Bush"
"Frère Jacques"
"The Dump Truck Song (from the Disneyland/Golden Book Read-Along The Happy Man And His Dump Truck)" (Larry Groce)
"Bingo"
"Polly Wolly Doodle"
"There Was an Old Lady"
"Carrot Stew (from the Disneyland/Golden Book Read-Along Tawny Scrawny Lion)" (Larry Groce)
"When the Saints Go Marching In"

References 

1979 compilation albums
Disneyland Records compilation albums
Children's music albums